The San Antonio class is a class of amphibious transport docks, also called a "landing platform, dock" (LPD), used by the United States Navy. These warships replace the  LPDs (including Cleveland and Trenton sub-classes), as well as the  tank landing ships, the  dock landing ships, and the  amphibious cargo ships that have already been retired.

Twelve ships of the San Antonio class were originally proposed, their original target price was US$890 million; as built, their average cost is $1.6 billion. Defense Authorization for Fiscal Year 2015 included partial funding for the twelfth San Antonio-class ship.  eleven warships of this class were in service with the U.S. Navy, with an additional three ships under construction. The Navy decided in 2018 to produce a second flight of 13 planned LPD Flight II ships, for a total of 26 in the LPD 17 class; LPD 30, Harrisburg, is the first Flight II ship.

Design

The San Antonio class was designed to provide the Navy and U.S. Marine Corps with modern, sea-based platforms that are networked, survivable, and built to operate with 21st century transformational platforms, such as the MV-22 Osprey, the (since canceled) Expeditionary Fighting Vehicle (EFV), air-cushioned landing craft (LCACs), and future means by which Marines are delivered ashore. The ship is more than 45 percent larger than the Austin class, displacing more than 25,000 tons at full load. It carries fewer troops, but has twice as much space for vehicles, landing craft, and aircraft. The ships are also suited to act as recovery ships for spacecraft, with a floodable well deck at the back of the vessel into which a capsule can float;   is the recovery ship for the Orion capsule of the Artemis 1 uncrewed Moon-orbiting mission on 11 December 2022.

The project embraced a "Design for Ownership" philosophy; a concurrent engineering approach that injects operator, maintainer, and trainer input into the design development process. The goal was to ensure that operational realities are considered throughout the total ship design, integration, construction, test and life cycle support of the new ships and their systems. This process was intended to improve combat readiness, enhance quality of life, and reduce Total Ownership Costs, and resulted in numerous changes during the project.

The San Antonio class has significant survivability features and computer technology. In addition to Rolling Airframe Missile (RAM) protection from air threats, the class was designed to minimize radar signature. Techniques that reduce radar cross-section (RCS) make the ships more difficult to locate and target. Enhanced survivability features include improved nuclear blast and fragmentation protection and a shock-hardened structure. The fiber-optic shipboard-wide area network (SWAN) connects onboard-integrated systems. The network will allow "plug in and fight" configuration, updating and replacing hardware more easily when newer technology becomes available. Moreover, the class has extensive communications, command, control, and intelligence systems to support current and projected expeditionary warfare missions of the 21st century.

The class is fitted with the integrated Ship Self-Defense System (SSDS).  The system fuses the radars and other sensors and controls the weapons systems for an automated fast reaction capability against air threats.

The Advanced Enclosed Mast/Sensors (AEM/S) System mast, a 93-foot-high octagonal structure 35 feet in diameter, is constructed of a multi-layer frequency-selective composite material. It is designed to permit the ship's own sensor frequencies with very low loss while reflecting other frequencies. The tapered octagonal shape of the AEM/S is designed to reduce the radar cross section, and enclosing the antennas provides improved performance and greatly reduces maintenance costs.

The San Antonio-class also incorporates the latest quality of life standards for the embarked Marines and sailors, including sit-up berths, a ship services mall, a learning resource center, and a fitness center. Medical facilities include two operating rooms and 124 beds. Additionally, they are the first USN ships designed to accommodate sailors and Marines of both sexes as part of the crew and embarked troops.

By mid-2016, the Navy and Marine Corps were studying installing a vertical launch system (VLS) into San Antonio-class ships so they could field larger offensive missiles.  The original ship concept included two 8-cell Mk 41 VLS in the bow, which is being reexamined to add Tomahawk cruise missiles to support Marines ashore with little modification to the combat system.

History
The DOT&E found in 2011 that the first ship of the class, USS San Antonio, had several deficiencies which rendered it "not operationally effective, suitable, or survivable in a hostile environment". In April 2015, the USN proposed adding a 12th ship to the class, which will be built at Ingalls in exchange for a destroyer to be named later. On 4 December 2015, the 12th ship was ordered.

Derivatives

U.S. senator Kay Hagan has asked if the LPD-17 construction line should be extended to a 12th ship as a bridge to building the LX(R) (formerly LSD(X)) on the same hull, but the USN has indicated that the requirements of the LX(R) have not yet been settled and that the LPD-17 hull might be too large for such a mission. However, Commandant James F. Amos had also endorsed dropping LSD in favor of continued LPD production. 

In October 2014, Secretary of the Navy Ray Mabus signed an internal memo recommending that the LX(R) warship be based on the existing San Antonio-class design. The LPD-17 design was selected over a foreign variant, and an entirely new design to meet required capability, capacity, and cost parameters. Official selection of basing the LX(R) off the LPD-17 design still has to come with Milestone A approval. The National Defense Authorization Act for Fiscal Year 2015 included partial funding for a twelfth San Antonio-class ship (LPD-28). In early 2014, Huntington Ingalls Industries (HII) displayed its Flight IIA version of the LPD-17 hull for the Navy's LX(R) amphibious ship. The Flight IIA has improved command and control (C2) features over the LSDs, half the medical spaces of the LPD-17, a smaller hangar, no composite masts, two unspecified main propulsion diesel engines (MPDE), two spots for LCACs or one LCU, a reduced troop capacity (500), and a crew of about 400 sailors. In January 2015, the Navy and Marine Corps decided to go with the modified LPD-17 hull for the LX(R) program.

Chief of Naval Operations Greenert considered using some of the extra space in the San Antonio class to mount modular equipment in the same fashion as the littoral combat ships. As part of their bid to offer "Flight II" LPD-17s for the dock landing ship replacement contract, HII has suggested fitting out the ships to carry the Aegis Ballistic Missile Defense System. Although there is no formal requirement for the BMD variant, HII report unofficial support for it within the U.S. Navy, such that it will be modeled in wargame scenarios in 2016 and 2017. It could accommodate up to 288 Mk41 VLS missile tubes and a radar with 1000 times the sensitivity of the SPY-1D radar of the Burke destroyers.

Flight II

On 2 August 2018, the U.S. Navy and Huntington Ingalls signed a contract for long lead items for LPD-30, the first of the 13-ship more affordable Flight II class. The contract was for US$165.5M. The cost goal is for US$1.64B for the first ship, and $1.4B for subsequent ships. LPD-30 will be fitted with a Raytheon AN/SPY-6 Enterprise Air Surveillance Radar, an upgrade over the AN/SPS-48 currently in LPD-17s. Huntington Ingalls will build the new flight exclusively. On 26 March 2019, Huntington Ingalls announced the award of a US$1.47 billion, fixed-price incentive contract for LPD 30 (14th ship and first of Flight II).

The Flight II ships are intended to provide the mission currently provided by the Whidbey Island-class dock landing ships and incorporate more than 200 changes over the Flight I ships. The mission provided by Flight II ships will include airport, seaport, and hospital operations and incorporate modifications to the ships’ well decks. 

, the US Navy is proposing to temporarily halt acquiring additional San Antonio class ships beyond LPD-32. This move would be part of a "strategic pause," according to Navy Secretary Carlos Del Toro, that would allow the force to better examine what they need to get out of the ships and how many they ultimately need. Under this plan, LPD-32 would be purchased in the 2022–2023 fiscal year.

Ships of the class

Gallery

References

External links

Amphibious Transport Dock - LPD (San Antonio class) page on Navy.mil
San Antonio class Landing Platform Dock on Ingalls Shipbuilding's site
San Antonio class Amphibious transport dock on Military today site
San Antonio Class (LPD 17) Amphibious Transport Dock on navyrecognition.com

 

 
Naval ships of the United States
Amphibious warfare vessel classes